Ira Mathur is an Indian-born Trinidad and Tobago multimedia freelance journalist, Sunday Guardian columnist and writer. The longest-running columnist for the Sunday Guardian, she has been writing an op-ed for the paper since 1995, except for a hiatus from 2003 to 2004 when she wrote for the Daily Express. She has written more than eight hundred columns on politics, economics, social, health and developmental issues, locally, regionally and internationally.

Biography 
Mathur is "the offspring of a Muslim mother and a Hindu army officer", was educated in India and the UK, and holds a liberal arts degree in Literature and Philosophy from Trent University in Canada, as well as an LLB from the University of London and a Diploma in International Journalism from City University, London.

In 2021, Mathur was longlisted for the Bath Novel Award 2021 for her unpublished first novel Touching Dr Simone (one of 31 novels chosen from a global submission of 2,058 manuscripts). Mathur's memoir Love The Dark Days was published by Peepal Tree Press in July 2022, garnering praise from such notable authors as Monique Roffey (who called it a "blaze of a book. Exquisite. Astonishing… Nothing like this has torn itself out of the Caribbean") and Earl Lovelace ("a compelling memoir of the binding power of love and the liberating beauty of forgiveness"). Reviewing it for The Observer, Bidisha wrote: "Love the Dark Days is compelling in its narrative richness. Mathur’s characters and the reader alike are put through the wringer as imperial occupation and political upheaval overlay the miseries of forced marriage and unwanted abandonments. ... a troubled and troubling book, a heady brew that stays with you."

In October 2021, Mathur was appointed uncontested president of the Media Association of T&T (MATT) at its Annual General Meeting.

Awards
 1996: Media Excellence Awards Royal Bank/ Media Association of Trinidad and Tobago - Best Commentary (Print)
 2018: Second prize winner of the Caribbean-based Small Axe Literary Competition for short fiction.

Bibliography 
 Touching Dr Simone, novel (2021)
 Love The Dark Days, memoir (2022)

References

External links
 
 Sarah Dara, "Interview with Ira Mathur", Renaissance One, July 27, 2021. 
 "In Conversation: Ira Mathur & Monique Roffey", Granta, 14 October 2022.

Alumni of King's College London
Indian emigrants to Trinidad and Tobago
Living people
Trinidad and Tobago journalists
Trinidad and Tobago television personalities
Trinidad and Tobago women journalists
Trinidad and Tobago women novelists
Year of birth missing (living people)
Trinidad and Tobago women writers
Women memoirists